Talk That may refer to:

 "Talk That"` (Timbaland song)
 "Talk That" (Secret song), 2012